Smolenskaya is a station on the Arbatsko–Pokrovskaya line of the Moscow Metro. It was built in 1953 to replace an older station of the same name, though that one was later reopened as part of the Filyovskaya line. The two stations are not connected.

Smolenskaya has square, white marble columns with fluted corners, decorative cornices, and ventilation grilles concealed behind ornamental sconces. At the end of the platform is a bas-relief by G.I. Motovilov entitled "The Defenders of Russia," which depicts soldiers of the Red Army in battle. The architects of the station were Igor Rozhin and G. P. Yakovlev. At 50 m below the surface, Smolenskaya was the deepest station on the line until Park Pobedy opened in 2003.

From 22 February 2020 to 9 July 2021, the station was closed for reconstruction due to the replacement of escalators.

There is no direct transfer to Smolenskaya planned, but there is an out-of-system transfer to it. A direct transfer to Plyushchika on the Kalininsko-Solntsevskaya line is planned.

Gallery

References

External links

metro.ru
mymetro.ru
KartaMetro.info – Station location and exits on Moscow map (English/Russian)

Moscow Metro stations
Railway stations in Russia opened in 1953
Railway stations closed in 2020
Arbatsko-Pokrovskaya Line
Railway stations located underground in Russia
Khamovniki District